Old San Francisco is a 1927 American silent historical drama film starring Dolores Costello and featuring Warner Oland. The film, which was produced and distributed by Warner Bros., was directed by Alan Crosland.

Plot
Chris Buckwell, cruel and greedy czar of San Francisco's Tenderloin District, is heartless in his persecution of the Chinese, though he himself is secretly a half-caste, part Chinese and part European. Buckwell, eager to possess the land of Don Hernandez Vasquez, sends Michael Brandon, an unscrupulous attorney, to make an offer. Brandon's nephew, Terrence, meets the grandee's beautiful daughter, Dolores, while Vasquez refuses the offer. Terry tries to save the Vasquez land grants, but when Chris causes the grandee's death, Dolores takes an oath to avenge her father. Learning that Chris is half Chinese, Dolores induces his feeble-minded dwarf brother to denounce him; he captures her and Terry, but they are saved from white slavery by the great earthquake of 1906 that kills the villain.

Cast

 Dolores Costello as Dolores Vasquez
 Warner Oland as Chris Buckwell
 Charles E. Mack as Terrence "Terry" O'Shaughnessy
 Josef Swickard as Don Hernandez de Vasquez
 Anders Randolph as Michael Brandon
 Angelo Rossita as Chang Loo, a dwarf
 Anna May Wong as A Flower of the Orient
 Lawson Butt as Captain Enrique de Solano Y Vasquez (in Prologue)
 Walter McGrail as Vasquez's grandson, who gets shot (in Prologue)
 Otto Matieson as another Vasquez grandson (in Prologue)
 Martha Mattox as Mother Vasquez (in Prologue)
 Thomas Santschi as Captain Stoner (in Prologue)
 Louise Carver as Big nosed woman on the Mile of Hell (uncredited)
 Rose Dione as Madame in Den of Iniquity (uncredited)
 Willie Fung as Chang Sue Lee's laughing servant (uncredited)
 Tom McGuire as Man at poodle dog cafe (uncredited)
 John Miljan as Don Luis (uncredited)
 Sōjin Kamiyama as Lu Fong (uncredited)

Production
The film was released in a silent version and in a Vitaphone version, with sound-on-disc recording of music and sound effects only. It was the fifth Warner Brothers feature film to have Vitaphone musical accompaniment. Just one month later, on October 6, Warner Bros. released The Jazz Singer with music, sound effects, and spoken dialogue. Warner Bros. later reused some of the footage from Old San Francisco for  the 1906 San Francisco earthquake sequence in The Sisters (1938). This is Charles Emmett Mack's final film appearance; he was killed in an automobile accident six months prior to the film's release.

Reception and box office
The film was a commercial success but it was considered a sub-par feature for its salacious elements. The New York Post called it "violently melodramatic and preposterous in the extreme -- and one of the silliest pictures ever made."

A slightly later reviewer wondered cynically why it had not been censored: "Just as the villain is giving thanks to Buddha, the San Francisco earthquake intervenes to save [Dolores and Terry], thus explaining a catastrophe that cost many lives. Old San Francisco was not censored because it satisfied the one great tenet of the movie censors: 'God is a force in the world that moves to preserve Christian virginity.' "

According to Warner Bros records the film earned $466,000 domestically and $172,000 foreign.

Preservation status
A print of the film still exists at the Library of Congress, George Eastman House and Wisconsin Center for Film and Theater Research, as well as its Vitaphone soundtrack and has been restored by the UCLA Film and Television Archive in association with other organizations such as the Library of Congress and the Museum of Modern Art. And was released on manufactured-on-demand DVD by the Warner Archive Collection series on September 15, 2009.

See also
 List of early Warner Bros. sound and talking features

References

External links
 
 
 
 
 
  Anna May Wong, Warner Oland & Dolores Costello in a scene from the film

1927 films
1920s historical drama films
American historical drama films
American silent feature films
American black-and-white films
Films about the 1906 San Francisco earthquake
Films directed by Alan Crosland
Films set in San Francisco
Transitional sound films
Warner Bros. films
Films produced by Darryl F. Zanuck
1927 drama films
Surviving American silent films
1920s American films
Silent American drama films
1920s English-language films